Kuvykta is a rural locality (a settlement) in Kuvyktinsky Selsoviet of Tyndinsky District, Amur Oblast, Russia. The population was 278 as of 2018. There is 1 street.

Geography 
Kuvykta is located 43 km west of Tynda (the district's administrative centre) by road. Kuryan is the nearest rural locality.

References 

Rural localities in Tyndinsky District